The 2018 Taça da Liga Final was the final match of the 2017–18 Taça da Liga, the 11th season of the Taça da Liga. It was played on 27 January 2018 at Estádio Municipal de Braga.

The competition involved the 33 clubs playing in the top two tiers of the Portuguese football league system – 18 from Primeira Liga and 15 from Segunda Liga – during the 2017–18 season. Reserve sides of Primeira Liga teams that played in the 2017–18 Segunda Liga were excluded from the competition.

Vitória de Setúbal and Sporting CP faced off in a repeat of the competition's first final, held 10 years previously. Sporting CP won 5–4 on a penalty shoot-out after a 1–1 draw at the end of 90 minutes, winning the competition for the first time in their history.

Background
For the second consecutive season, this competition featured a final four format with both the semi-finals and the final being played over a space of a few days in the same venue. The Estádio Municipal de Braga hosted all matches. The two teams had played in the inaugural final in 2008 with Vitória de Setúbal winning on penalty kicks. Sporting CP had the chance to win their first Taça da Liga while Vitória de Setúbal could be the first team, other than Benfica, to win the competition multiple times. Both teams were aiming for their first title of the season.

Route to the final

Note: In all results below, the score of the finalist is given first (H: home; A: away; N: neutral).

Match

Summary
Gonçalo Paciência opened the scoreline with an early goal after disputing the ball with Uruguayan Sebastián Coates, a left-foot strike on the turn to the bottom left corner from just outside the box. Both teams had clear chances to score throughout the match, with Sporting CP trying a breakthrough heading to the final third of the match. Sporting CP managed to equalise late in the game when it was determined, with the help of the video assistant referee, Vitória de Setúbal midfielder Tomás Podstawski had handballed inside his area after a series of saves by their goalkeeper Pedro Trigueira. Dutch forward Bas Dost scored the subsequent penalty low to the middle. After the 90 minutes, the match was settled by a penalty shoot-out. Sporting CP won as Podstawski was the only player to miss his penalty after he hit the crossbar. The match had one of the highest amounts of yellow cards in the competition's final, a total of nine, six for Vitória de Setúbal, including Edinho, who was booked after taking his penalty.

Details

References

2018
Taca da Liga
Vitória F.C. matches
Sporting CP matches
January 2018 sports events in Europe
Association football penalty shoot-outs